Lepidochrysops dunni, the Boorman's giant Cupid, is a butterfly in the family Lycaenidae. It is found in Nigeria. The habitat consists of Guinea savanna.

Adults have been recorded in May.

References

Butterflies described in 2003
Lepidochrysops
Endemic fauna of Nigeria
Butterflies of Africa